Dactylosaster is a genus of echinoderms belonging to the family Ophidiasteridae.

The species of this genus are found in Indian and Pacific Ocean.

Species:

Dactylosaster cylindricus 
Dactylosaster gracilis

References

Ophidiasteridae
Asteroidea genera